Joshua David Wolson (born 1974) is a United States district judge of the United States District Court for the Eastern District of Pennsylvania.

Education 
Wolson graduated from Parkland High School in South Whitehall Township, Pennsylvania. He then earned his Bachelor of Arts magna cum laude from the University of Pennsylvania and his Juris Doctor cum laude from Harvard Law School.

Legal career 
After graduating law school, he served as a law clerk to Judge Jan E. DuBois of the United States District Court for the Eastern District of Pennsylvania. Wolson then became an associate in the litigation and antitrust groups of Covington & Burling in Washington, D.C., where he worked for eight years.

He returned to Philadelphia and joined Dilworth Paxson's litigation group in 2008, becoming a partner in 2010. He represented plaintiffs and defendants in complex litigation matters, including antitrust, RICO, intellectual property, procurement, and civil rights disputes. He also served as a co-chair of the firm's Plaintiffs' Rights Practice Group and a member of the firm's Executive Committee.

Federal judicial service 
On May 10, 2018, President Donald Trump announced his intent to nominate Wolson to serve as a United States district judge for the United States District Court for the Eastern District of Pennsylvania. On May 15, 2018, his nomination was sent to the Senate. He was nominated to the seat that was vacated by Judge James Knoll Gardner, who assumed senior status on April 3, 2017. On July 11, 2018, a hearing on his nomination was held before the Senate Judiciary Committee. On September 13, 2018, his nomination was reported out of committee by a 13–8 vote.

On January 3, 2019, his nomination was returned to the President under Rule XXXI, Paragraph 6 of the United States Senate. On January 23, 2019, President Trump announced his intent to renominate Wolson for a federal judgeship. His nomination was sent to the Senate later that day. On February 7, 2019, his nomination was reported out of committee by a 14–8 vote. On May 1, 2019, the Senate invoked cloture on his nomination by a 64–35 vote.  On May 2, 2019, his nomination was confirmed by a 65–33 vote. He received his judicial commission on May 28, 2019.

Memberships 

On his Senate Judiciary Committee questionnaire, Wolson reported being a member of the Federalist Society, the American Bar Association, Republican Jewish Coalition and the Republican National Lawyers Association.

See also 
 List of Jewish American jurists

References

External links 
 

1974 births
Living people
Parkland High School (Pennsylvania) alumni
20th-century American lawyers
21st-century American lawyers
21st-century American judges
Federalist Society members
Harvard Law School alumni
Judges of the United States District Court for the Eastern District of Pennsylvania
Pennsylvania lawyers
Pennsylvania Republicans
People from Ann Arbor, Michigan
United States district court judges appointed by Donald Trump
University of Pennsylvania alumni